The rubro-olivary tract (rubroolivary fibers) is a tract which connects the inferior olive and the parvocellular red nucleus.

It is hypothesized that it uses both the corticospinal tract and rubrospinal tract.

References

External links
 http://www.ucsf.edu/nreview/02.1-Anatomy-Brain&SC/Cerebellum.html

Central nervous system pathways